Oldřich Pařízek (born 24 March 1972) is a retired football goalkeeper who played for clubs in Czechoslovakia and Belgium.

Career
Pařízek spent most of his career playing in Czechoslovakia, but he played for Belgian Pro League side Royal Antwerp FC from 1998 to 2002. He finished his playing career with Gambrinus liga side FK Viktoria Žižkov.

References

External links

Profile at rafc.be
Czech league statistics at JFK-Fotbal

1972 births
Living people
Czech footballers
Czech First League players
FK Mladá Boleslav players
FK Jablonec players
FK Viktoria Žižkov players
1. FK Příbram players
Royal Antwerp F.C. players
Expatriate footballers in Belgium
Association football goalkeepers
Sportspeople from Mladá Boleslav